Piła is a city in Greater Poland Voivodeship, west Poland, known as Schneidemühl from 1772 to 1945 while under Prussian or German rule.

Piła may also refer to the following places in Poland:
Piła, Kuyavian-Pomeranian Voivodeship (north-central Poland)
Piła, Łódź Voivodeship (central Poland)
Piła, Jędrzejów County in Świętokrzyskie Voivodeship (south-central Poland)
Piła, Końskie County in Świętokrzyskie Voivodeship (south-central Poland)
Piła, Subcarpathian Voivodeship (south-east Poland)
Piła, Ostrów Wielkopolski County in Greater Poland Voivodeship (west-central Poland)
Piła, Pleszew County in Greater Poland Voivodeship (west-central Poland)
Piła, Szamotuły County in Greater Poland Voivodeship (west-central Poland)
Piła, Pomeranian Voivodeship (north Poland)

See also
 Pila (disambiguation)